Ilona (born January 24, 1985) is a singer-songwriter born and raised in Bogotá, Colombia. Her beginnings in music were through presentations on the public transport bus service in Bogotá when she was 15 years old, and her surprised audience gave her money. Ilona played with her guitar on public places and eventually established a band with a bassist and a drummer with whom she performed regularly in bars in the city. At 24, Ilona released her first studio album, entitled Desde Mi Ventana ("From My Window"), produced by Cachorro López, gaining momentum, and receiving a Latin Grammy Award nomination for Best New Artist. Her debut album sold 15,000 units in Colombia earning the singer a Gold album certification. Ilona caught the attention of Argentine musician León Gieco and agreed to do a duet with her on the song "En La Zona". English boy band Blue also recorded with Ilona the song "One Love".

In 2004, Colombian singer Soraya, during her promotional tour in Chile, sponsored Ilona, who was visiting the country on a promotional plan on radio stations and newspapers. Upon learning of her presence in Chile, Soraya invited her as the opening act of her concert at the Teatro Providencia. Three years later, Ilona released her second album, Allá En El Sur, a 'rock' focused album produced by Benny Faccone. The album was nominated for a Latin Grammy Award for Best Female Pop Vocal Album at the 8th Latin Grammy Awards, losing to Yo Canto by Italian performer Laura Pausini. Ilona acknowledges as an influence to her music the work of Ella Fitzgerald, Tracy Chapman, Norah Jones, John Mayer, Alanis Morissette and Sting.

Discography

 Desde mi Ventana (2005)
 Allá en el Sur (2007)
 Aquí y Ahora (2013)
 Viajera (2017)

Awards and nominations

Latin Grammy Awards

A Latin Grammy Award is an accolade by the Latin Academy of Recording Arts & Sciences to recognize outstanding achievement in the music industry. Ilona has received an award from three nominations; this award was won by the children's album with various artists.

|-
| 2005 || Ilona || Best New Artist || 
|-
| 2007 || Allá en el Sur || Best Female Pop Vocal Album || 
|-
| 2009 || Pombo Musical || Best Latin Children's Album || 
|-

Los Premios MTV Latinoamérica
Los Premios MTV Latinoamérica or VMALA's is the Latin American version of the Video Music Awards. Ilona received a nomination in 2006.

|-
| 2006 || Ilona || Best New Artist — Central || 
|-

Premios Shock
Shock Awards are the most important awards in Colombia. Ilona received an award in 2005.

|-
| 2005 || Ilona || Best New Artist|| 
|-
| rowspan="3"|2007
| Allá en el Sur
| Record of the Year
| 
|-
| rowspan="2"|Ilona
| Voice of the Year
| 
|-
| Best Artist or National Association
| 
|-
| 2013 || "Tu Mal Me Hizo Bien" || Best Female Soloist|| 
|-

Premios Nuestra Tierra
Premios Nuestra Tierra is an annual awards show honouring the creativity and drive of Colombian artists since 2007.

|-
| rowspan="2" align="center"|2008
| rowspan="2" |Ilona
| Best Pop Solo or Group of the Year
|
|-
| Best Colombian Artist Website
|
|-

References

Living people
21st-century Colombian women singers
1985 births
Singers from Bogotá
Women in Latin music